Isaac Chauncey (February 20, 1772 – January 27, 1840) was an American naval officer in the United States Navy who served in the Quasi-War, The Barbary Wars and the War of 1812. In the latter part of his naval career he was President of the Board of Navy Commissioners.

Involvement in the Quasi-War and First Barbary War
Chauncey, born in Black Rock, Connecticut, was appointed a lieutenant in the Navy from September 17, 1798. He fought with gallantry in the West Indies during the Quasi-War with France; in the Mediterranean during the First Barbary War; and commanded John Adams (1804–5), Hornet (1805–6), Washington and the Mediterranean Squadron (1815–1820). He was promoted to captain in 1806.

War of 1812
Perhaps his most outstanding service was during the War of 1812 when he commanded the naval forces on Lake Ontario, conducting amphibious operations in cooperation with the Army, and containing the British fleet under the command of Sir James Yeo stationed there. He also served twice as commandant of the New York Naval Shipyard. Isaac Chauncey played a prominent role in the creation of the navy yard. His service there, began prior to its official designation as a shipyard.

Raiding British Shipment
On November 6, 1812, Commodore Isaac Chauncey set out on a raiding expedition to intercept the enemy vessels on their return from Fort George to Kingston. The enemies force was the Royal George, 26 guns, 260 men; the Earl of Moira, 18 guns, 200 men; the Prince Regent, 18 guns, 150 men; the Duke of Gloucester, 14 guns, 80 men; the Simcoe 12 guns, 76 men; and the Seneca, 4 guns, 40 men. On November 8th, Commodore Chauncey fell in the Royal George and chased her into the Bay of Quinte. On the morning of Nov. 10th he took a small schooner and burnt it, and chased the Royal George into Kingston harbor, and engaged her batteries for an hour and forty-five minutes, but stood off with night coming up. The American loss in this engagement was one killed and three wounded. The next morning, with winds to strong to attack, he turned out and soon came upon the Simcoe. They chased her over a reef of rocks and severely disabled her with shot. Commodore Chauncey returned to Sackets Harbor on the 12th of November with 3 captured British trading schooners.

Raids the following week
In the following week, Commadore Chaunceys fleet made two short cruises and captured three vessels. Two of the vessels were brought into Sackets Harbor and the third was burnt and sunk.

First Raid on York

Commodore Chauncey was the commander of the American fleet transporting 1,700 American Regulars with Benjamin Forsyth’s Riflemen leading the way. The American raiding force landed on the beach and routed the British-allied forces. The British-allied force suffering heavy casualties retreated from the field. The Americans occupied York for a while looting and burning private property. Then all of the Americans boarded Chauncey’s vessels and the entire American raiding force withdrew safely.

Raid on Burlington Heights
From around July 30, 1813 to July 31, 1813. Commodore Chauncey with his fleet arrived near Burlington Heights from Niagara during the morning. A force of several hundred troops, including sailors and U.S. Marines, under Lt. Colonel Winfield Scott, debarked. About 150 British under Major Maule raised stiff resistance. The Americans seized some prisoners (civilians, possibly militia in the town) and returned to the ships. The American fleet then departed.

Second Raid on York
One of his most successful operations was taking part of a naval raid by transporting Winfield Scott's force of raiders in the successful raid at York, Upper Canada from July 31, 1813 – August 1, 1813. Isaac Chauncey transported Winfield's American raiding force of 340-500 men to York. The American raiders freed prisoners in jail, made wounded soldiers their captives (on paper), and confiscated British military baggage left there and whatever else they could find. The next day, the American raiders found a hidden bateaux and carted off 400 barrels of food. The Americans also took 11 bateaux, 5 cannons, and some flour. Winfield and his American force of raiders set fire to barracks, a wood yard, and a storehouse on Gibraltar Point. Winfield and his force of American raiders withdrew safely aboard Chauncey’s ships. The American raiders destroyed some artillery, destroy some boats, confiscate supplies, confiscate ammunition, and all withdraw back to New York.

Raid on Lake Ontario
Around October 5, 1813. Commander Isaac Chauncey was sailing with his fleet and spotted some British vessels sail on Lake Ontario. Chauncey pursued the British fleet which consisted of 7 British gunboats being used as transports. Chauncey’s fleet captured five of the British gunboats and destroyed one British gunboat. The remaining British gunboat escaped. 260 British soldiers are captured. Isaac Chauncey and his fleet withdrew back to Sacket’s Harbor with the captured ships and 260 British prisoners.

Further Career
Chauncey went on to be Brooklyn's longest serving commandant July 13, 1807 – May 16, 1813, and again December 21, 1824 – June 10, 1833.  His letters to the Secretary of the Navy provide perhaps the fullest picture and most candid portrait by a career naval officer of the early yard.  These letters deliver rich detail about the officers and employees, and the problems he encountered making the new yard a viable concern. 

Writing November 27, 1807 to the Secretary of the Navy, Chauncey pleads for maintenance funds – "The following things are almost indispensable to promote the public service and for the accommodation of the yard. Two wells to be sunk, in the yard, with pumps in them, windows in the armory, a horse & cart to transport stores, fill holes about the wharf &c &c The tide ebbs & flows in 24 hours consequently leaving a dampness that must destroy the timber next to the ground very soon There is sufficient for the horse in the yard Six wheel barrows with more other little conveniences which I will hope you will leave to my discretion I will not abuse you’re your confidence." 

Commodore Chauncey was particularly tough when negotiating wages. Writing on January 5, 1808, to Secretary of the Navy Robert Smith he explained "Some of them (in consequence of Mr. Buckland having mentioned publicly that twenty three gun boats was to be built) immediately had an idea that we could not do without them and would not go to work. 

I however was able to find a sufficient number willing to work at the reduced wages and these who refused will in a week come back and beg for work and I shall be able to reduce their wages 25 cents more for the merchants have no work for them to do therefore  they must either work for us at our price or go unemployed." 

In May 1829, while in command of the shipyard, Chauncey led a series of searches for the body of George Washington Adams, who committed suicide by jumping from the deck of the steamship Benjamin Franklin. 

In December 1835 Chauncey led navy yard marines and sailors in suppressing the Great Fire of New York  by blowing up buildings in the fire's path. 

His last service was as member, and, for four years, President, of the Board of Navy Commissioners. Commodore Chauncey died in Washington, on January 27, 1840.

Legacy

Three different classes of destroyers USS Chauncey were named in his honor

Issac was married to Catherine Sickles (circa 1778-1855).

The couple lived in Fairfield, Connecticut where they had three children.
Charles W. Chauncey
John S. Chauncey
Peter Schermerhorn Chauncey (1810-1866)
His daughter Augusta married to Major Elbert Ellery Anderson (1833-1903). Founding father William Ellery was his great-great-granduncle. His grandfathers were  Knight commander Henry James Anderson, and Lorenzo Da Ponte of Venice, Father of Italian Opera in the United States, and associate of Amadeus Mozart. 

His cousin was also merchant Elbert Jefferson Anderson, a millionaire of 1892, son of Lt. Col. Elbert Jefferson Anderson.

Their children were Peter Chauncey Anderson, who married May Yale Ogden, of the Yale and Ogden family, and Henry James Anderson.

References

Further reading
 Dudley, William S.; Cogar, William B., Ed. (1989) "Commodore Isaac Chauncey and U.S. Joint Operations on Lake Ontario, 1813–14." In New Interpretations in Naval History: Selected Papers From the Eighth Naval History Symposium Naval Institute Press, Annapolis.
 Url
 Url

External links
The Isaac Chauncey papers, at the William L. Clements Library contain professional letters and documents from throughout Chauncey's naval career.

1772 births
1840 deaths
United States Navy personnel of the War of 1812
American military personnel of the Quasi-War
American military personnel of the First Barbary War
18th-century American naval officers
19th-century American naval officers
Military personnel from Bridgeport, Connecticut
United States Navy commodores